Isabela Cristina Correia de Lima Lima (born 3 September 1990), known professionally as IZA, is a Brazilian singer, songwriter and dancer, who rose to fame recording cover songs of artists such as Beyoncé, Rihanna, and Sam Smith on her self-titled YouTube channel. She has also featured her songs on Spotify and SoundCloud. In May 2016, she signed a contract with Warner Music Brasil. Her debut album, Dona de Mim, was released in 2018 and was nominated for a Latin Grammy Award for Best Portuguese Language Contemporary Pop Album.

Early life 
Iza was born in Rio de Janeiro, Brazil. At the age of six, her family moved to Natal, Rio Grande do Norte, where she began singing and performing at family parties and church events. After moving back to Rio de Janeiro at the age of eighteen, she got a degree in advertising from Pontifical Catholic University of Rio de Janeiro and  then she started her YouTube channel shortly thereafter.

Career 
At the age of 19 she returned to Rio de Janeiro and continued with that activity here as well. In 2009, at the age of eighteen, she attended the advertising course at the Pontifical Catholic University of Rio de Janeiro (PUC-Rio), graduating in 2013 and then began working as a video editor. In 2015, in parallel, she created a channel on YouTube and began posting music cover videos.

At the end of 2017, she was the main attraction of Pré-Reveillon POPline. On February 3, 2018, she participated in the Planeta Atlântida festival.

Her album Dona de Mim was ranked as the 41st best Brazilian album of 2018 by the Brazilian edition of Rolling Stone magazine and among the 25 best Brazilian albums of the first half of 2018 by the São Paulo Association of Art Critics.

In May 2021, Iza was named one of Time Magazine's Next Generation Leaders.

Personal life
In 2016, Iza began dating Brazilian music producer Sérgio Santos. She married him in the Nossa Senhora da Glória do Outeiro Church, in Rio de Janeiro on December 16, 2018.

In 2022, Iza declared she is demisexual.

Discography

Studio albums

Singles

Promotional singles

Filmography

Television

Films

Awards and nominations

References

Living people
1990 births
21st-century Brazilian singers
21st-century Brazilian women singers
Afro-Brazilian female dancers
Afro-Brazilian women singers
Afro-Brazilian women singer-songwriters
Afro-Brazilian feminists
Afro-Brazilian singer-songwriters
Brazilian contemporary R&B singers
Brazilian female dancers
Brazilian women pop singers
Feminist musicians
Musicians from Rio de Janeiro (city)
People from Natal
Pontifical Catholic University of Rio de Janeiro alumni
Women in Latin music
Demisexual people